Muy Interesante (meaning Very Interesting in English) is a monthly popular science magazine which deals with fun facts and current events, such as the development of nanotechnology, physics, biology, astronomy, genetics, neurosciences, new investigations and inventions, and world affairs.

History and profile
Muy Interesante was first published in May 1981. The owner and publisher of the magazine is Grupo G+J España Ediciones, S.L., a subsidiary of the German media company Bertelsmann. The magazine is published monthly. The headquarters of the magazine is in Madrid.

The magazine is also published in Mexico (Editorial Televisa); Argentina (Editorial Televisa, 1986); Colombia (Editorial Cinco); and as Super Interessante in Brazil (Editora Abril, 1987), Portugal (Edimpresa Editora, 1998) and Chile (Editorial Lord Cochrane, 1987).

Circulation
The circulation of Muy Interesante was 284,284 copies in 1993, making it the tenth best-selling magazine in Spain. In 1997 the magazine sold 282,155 copies. The average circulation of the monthly was 267,442 in 2003 and 259,545 copies in 2004. It was the sixth best-selling Spanish magazine in 2005 with a circulation of 258,297 copies.

Muy Interesante sold 208,880 copies in 2009.

See also
 List of magazines in Spain

References

This article includes content from the Spanish Wikipedia article Muy Interesante (revista).

External links

1981 establishments in Spain
Magazines established in 1981
Magazines published in Madrid
Monthly magazines published in Spain
Spanish-language magazines
Science and technology magazines published in Spain
Gruner + Jahr